Igor Vinícius de Souza (born 1 April 1997), known as Igor Vinícius, is a Brazilian professional footballer who plays as a right-back for São Paulo FC.

Club career

Santos
Born in Sinop, Mato Grosso, Igor joined Santos' youth setup in 2010, aged 12. After progressing through the club's youth setup, he was called up to the main squad for a Copa do Brasil match against Santos-AP on 20 April 2016.

Igor made his professional debut on 21 April 2016, coming on as a half-time substitute for fellow youth graduate Leandrinho in the 1–1 draw at the Zerão. He featured in just one more match for the first team before leaving in August of the following year.

Ituano
In September 2017, Igor signed with Ituano until the end of 2019, being initially assigned to the under-20s to build match fitness. A regular starter during the 2018 Campeonato Paulista, he scored his first senior goal on 17 January in a 3–1 home win against São Caetano.

Ponte Preta (loan)
On 27 March 2018, Igor was loaned to Ponte Preta until the end of the season. He was an undisputed starter for Ponte during the year, contributing with 30 appearances as his side narrowly missed out promotion.

São Paulo
On 4 December 2018, Igor signed a one-year loan deal with São Paulo. He made his debut for the club the following 3 February, starting in a 1–0 home win against São Bento.

Initially a first-choice, Igor lost space to Hudson, during the latter stages of the 2019 Campeonato Paulista. He made his Série A debut on 27 April 2019, playing the full 90 minutes in a 2–0 home defeat of Botafogo.

Igor scored his first goal in the top tier on 8 December 2019, netting his team's second in a 2–1 away success over CSA.

Career statistics

Honours
São Paulo
Campeonato Paulista: 2021

References

External links
Santos official profile 

1997 births
Living people
Sportspeople from Mato Grosso
Brazilian footballers
Association football defenders
Campeonato Brasileiro Série A players
Campeonato Brasileiro Série B players
Santos FC players
Ituano FC players
Associação Atlética Ponte Preta players
São Paulo FC players